is a Japanese manga series written and illustrated by Hitsuji Yamada. It began serialization on Kodansha's Suiyōbi no Sirius online manga section on the Nico Nico Seiga website in August 2018, and is also published in Monthly Shōnen Sirius since October 2021. An anime television series adaptation by GoHands is set to premiere in July 2023.

Characters

Media

Manga
Written and illustrated by Hitsuji Yamada, The Masterful Cat Is Depressed Again Today began serialization on Kodansha's Suiyōbi no Sirius online manga section on the Nico Nico Seiga website on August 22, 2018; it also started publication in Monthly Shōnen Sirius on October 26, 2021. Kodansha has collected its chapters into individual wideban volumes. The first volume was released on April 9, 2019. As of February 9, 2023, seven volumes have been released.

In North America, the manga is licensed for English release by Seven Seas Entertainment.

Volume list

Anime
In May 2022, it was announced that the series will be adapted into an anime television series. The series is produced by GoHands, who will be supervising the scripts written by Tamazo Yanagi, with Katsumasa Yokomine directing, Susumu Kudo serving as chief director, and Takayuki Uchida designing the characters. It is set to premiere in July 2023 on the Animeism programming block on MBS and other affiliates.

Reception
The series ranked 11th on "Nationwide Bookstore Employees' Recommended Comics of 2020" by the Honya Club online bookstore.

Notes

References

Further reading

External links
  
  
 

2023 anime television series debuts
Anime series based on manga
Animeism
Comedy anime and manga
Comics about cats
GoHands
Japanese webcomics
Kodansha manga
Seven Seas Entertainment titles
Shōnen manga
Slice of life anime and manga
Upcoming anime television series
Webcomics in print